Sainte-Félicité is a municipality in La Matanie Regional County Municipality of Quebec, Canada, located on the south shore of the Saint Lawrence River. It is named after Felicitas of Rome, a martyred saint. Its economy is based on fishing and agriculture.

Notable people who came from Sainte-Félicité include Québécois pop singer Isabelle Boulay, who was born there in 1972.

In addition to Sainte-Félicité itself, the municipality also includes the communities of Cap-à-la-Baleine, L'Anse-à-la-Croix, Le Grand-Deuxième, Le Petit-Deuxième, and Sainte-Félicité-Ouest.

History
According to recent studies, Cap à la Baleine (Cape Whale) was how far Jacques Cartier sailed up the Saint Lawrence in 1534. It was also an area with many shipwrecks, earning it the name Pointe-au-Massacre (Massacre Point), sometimes pluralized as Pointe-aux-Massacres. While Saint-Denis, the name of the geographic township, was used concurrently, the macabre name remained in use until the mid 19th century and was the inspiration for the current name, because Bishop Charles-François Baillargeon wrote "je change le Massacre en Félicité" ("I change the massacre to happiness") in 1860.

In 1857, a mission was established. In 1864, the post office opened under the name Sainte-Félicité. In 1866, the place was incorporated as the Township Municipality of Saint-Denis, but two years later changed its name and status to Parish Municipality of Sainte-Félicité.

In 1955, the main settlement separated from the parish municipality and was incorporated as the Village Municipality of Sainte-Félicité.

On January 10, 1996, the current Municipality of Sainte-Félicité was formed when the Village Municipality and Parish Municipality were rejoined together again.

Demographics

Population

See also
 List of municipalities in Quebec

References

Designated places in Quebec
Municipalities in Quebec
Incorporated places in Bas-Saint-Laurent